Cüneyt Özdemir (born 8 February 1970) is a Turkish journalist, television host and producer. Özdemir is the anchorman of the leading local and foreign affairs program 5N1K, broadcast on CNN Türk Television for 20 years now.

Career

32. Gün international affairs program
Özdemir started his journalism career at 32. Gün international affairs program. He worked there as the executive director of  the program. 32. Gün was produced and presented by prominent Turkish journalist Mehmet Ali Birand. In 1996, Özdemir became an international war correspondent where he has reported on major political crisis sites at many of the world's hotspots including the Lebanese-Israeli border, Iraq and Afghanistan. He covered numerous special stories from war zones. Özdemir was given his first major assignment covering the Gulf War. Through this position, he was able to make prominent coverages for the program. Özdemir, at his young age, gained recognition and reputation for being brave at such wars and for reporting from conflict areas.

CNN Türk
In 1999, he helped found CNN Türk. In 2000, he founded Turkey's pioneer international news program 5N1K which takes its name from the six fundamental questions of journalism which are What (Ne), When (Ne Zaman), Where (Nerede), Why (Neden), How (Nasil) and Who (Kim). He has been producing and presenting the program 5N1K which is broadcast on CNN Türk Television for 20 years now. The program has won Turkey’s all prestigious journalism awards, at least several times.

Between years 2012 and 2013 he presented the program from The London Studios. Throughout the years, the program focused on international wars, political affairs, world cups, Olympics, fashion weeks, groundbreaking news from all over the world as well as Turkish Diplomacy and local affairs. The program has managed to combine hard news and soft news with a colorful and vivid perspective. Over the years, Özdemir has reported on major crises from many of world's hotspots including Iraq, Afghanistan, Pakistan, the Palestinian territories and Israel. He has secured exclusive interviews at such countries. He has had many memorable moments in his television career.

He went to Athens in 2004 to cover the World Olympics. 

In 2006, he visited the Guantánamo Bay detention camp in Cuba and produced an investigative news story there.

In 2007, he followed the Nobel Prize Award Ceremony in Stockholm. That year, his program 5N1K was aired on CNN Türk for the 300th time.

In 2008, he went to Latin America and followed the leftist movement there. He also worked on an investigative story at Harvard University where he covered new cell practices.

In 2011, he went to Libya to follow the political chaos at the heart of the country. There, Özdemir has conducted a groundbreaking interview with Libya's deposed leader Muammar Gaddafi's son Seyful Islam Muammar Gaddafi.

In 2014, Cüneyt Özdemir went to Gaza and Tel Aviv, which are 2 different sides of the war. There he covered an exclusive story and told 2 city's stories to the world.

In 2017, Cüneyt Özdemir followed the Reza Zarrab case in the courtroom from day one to last day. He made live broadcasts on YouTube -in front of the court- everyday and reported last updates about the case. The world learned about the case and last updates from his exclusive live broadcasts and 5N1K program Reza Zarrab Exclusive episodes. By his Reza Zarrab news case he won Journalists Union of Turkey's TV News Program Award.

In 2019, he went to Caracas, Venezuela to follow the political-social chaos and coup attempt. There, Cüneyt Özdemir made a very crucial and groundbreaking interview with Mr. Nicolas Maduro. This interview was Nicolas Maduro's first interview after the coup attempt. The world followed what's happening in Venezuela via Cüneyt Özdemir's exclusive news both from his YouTube channel and 5N1K program.

His other prominent works include interviews with Recep Tayyip Erdoğan, Christiane Amanpour, Noam Chomsky, Felice Casson Gladio, Orhan Pamuk, Zaha Hadid, Liz Hurley and Hugh Jackman. Özdemir continues to cover important news stories from all over the world.

Kanal D News 
On 28 October 2014, Özdemir announced he would leave CNN Türk for Kanal D, where he would anchor the daily news bulletin of Kanal D. He hosted his first broadcast on 3 November 2014. On 7 August 2015, Kanal D announced Özdemir would be leaving his post as anchor of Kanal D, and returning to CNN Türk, where he had previously worked for 15 years, maintaining his role at prominent news program 5N1K.

Radikal newspaper 
Between years 2011 and 2014, Özdemir wrote for Radikal newspaper. Özdemir wrote 5 days a week at his column at Radikal. He has written extensively on political affairs, global issues, pop-cultural developments, Middle East and Europe at this column.

Dipnot TV 
Özdemir founded the production company DIPNOT TV in 2008. Over the years, company has produced prominent TV programs, most importantly the news program 5N1K that has been aired on CNN Türk for more than 15 years now. Özdemir has also produced Sağır Oda, a popular Turkish TV series between 2006 and 2007.

DIPNOT TV Company led by Cüneyt Özdemir continues to produce TV shows and documentaries. Özdemir created new business models in publicity, media and social media projects. His company also produces corporate promotion shootings, advertisements, viral videos both for internet and TV platforms as well as social media campaigns. Over the years Özdemir's production company has worked with numerous important clients including Akbank, Kalebodur, Turkcell, Vodafone, Google, Ericson, Coca-Cola, Efes Pilsen, Tuborg, Unilever, Chevrolet and so on.

Dipnot Production Company also undertook the production of a prominent European Union project called "We Have a Message". The company conducted this project with its partner Happy Idea and its participants TÜSEV (Turkish third sector trust) and Turk Journal. The project was carried out  within the scope of civil society dialogue III/Media donation program. "We Have a Message" project aimed at ameliorating communities' perception and understanding of each other and also at increasing the participation of their citizens. The project also intended to emphasize the effects of European Union endorsements on social development with 8 short films and a documentary. Özdemir's company produced these films and documentaries.

The company is also a pioneer in terms of digital media  in Turkey. Özdemir has launched Turkey's first and the widely read digital magazine Dipnot Tablet in 2009. The Digital Magazine Dipnot has been weekly published for 6 years now. The magazine's content focuses on technology, entertainment and design. The online magazine Dipnot covers politics and economics as well. Özdemir currently writes his weekly articles only for Dipnot Tablet.

YouTube
Besides his career as an anchor on Turkish Television (Kanal D & CNN Türk), he is one of the pioneers of digital media in Turkey. He continues to follow and comment on world agenda day by day from a different perspective in his live YouTube broadcasts .

In 2017, the world followed Reza Zarrab case from his YouTube exclusive live broadcasts daily.  

In 2018, he presented Turkey's presidential election program live from his YouTube channel. Program lasted for 8 hours and was the most watched election program in Turkey with 700K views. Before the election he interviewed various presidential candidates in his YouTube channel.

In 2019, he presented the real life in Venezuela both by reporting from the streets of Venezuela and his live broadcasts. His "Venezuela Series" followed both by Turkish people and people around the world. He also made a special interview with Nicolas Maduro. This interview was Maduro's first interview after the coup attempt. The world followed what's happening in Venezuela from Cüneyt Özdemir's YouTube videos. 

In 2019, his March 2019 mayoral election program was watched 1.7 million and lasted for 7 hours. Again this program became the most watched election program that day. He hosted the June 2019 Istanbul mayoral election program from US with several guests from different parts of Turkey. This election program watched by 1M people and was the most watched election program that day.

At the end of 2019, he started his daily coronavirus broadcasts on YouTube. He presents daily news from all around the world about the COVID-19 pandemic from a different perspective.

Personal life 
Özdemir is married to Zeynep İnanoğlu. Their son was born in 2012.

His mother is of Turkish Meskhetian origin.

Works

Documentary
 Özdemir, Cüneyt. Everyone's Father Has A Story To Tell. 2000
 Özdemir, Cüneyt. Money's Adventure. 2000
 Özdemir, Cüneyt. Gold Handcuff to Water. 2000
 Özdemir, Cüneyt. Maiden's Tower Legend. CNN Türk. 2000
 Özdemir, Cüneyt. The Man Who Last Laughed: Kemal Sunal. 2001
 Özdemir, Cüneyt. Football's Turkey Journey. CNN Türk, 2002
 Özdemir, Cüneyt. Festival.
 Özdemir, Cüneyt. Love For Cars. CNN Türk, 2002

TV series
 Sağır Oda (The Deaf Room) producer

TV programs
 32. Gün (32nd Day)
 5N1K
 Soruyorum (I Am Asking)
 Fark Yaratanlar (Changemakers)
 An Extraordinary Day

Books
 Özdemir, Cüneyt. Commander's Suspicious Death, Eşref Bitlis Case. İletişim Yayınları, 1988. 
 Özdemir, Cüneyt. State of Mind. Parantez Publications, 1998. 
 Özdemir, Cüneyt. Sound of Delusion. Parantez Publications, 1999. 
 Özdemir, Cüneyt. Talks Without Ratings. Su Publications, 2000. 
 Özdemir, Cüneyt. Maiden's Tower  Legend. Su Publications, 2001. 
 Özdemir, Cüneyt. I Was With Them But I Wasn't From Them. Doğan Books, 2003. 
 Özdemir, Cüneyt. Out Of Focus. Yapı Kredi Publication, 2005. 
 Özdemir, Cüneyt. Half Mind of Mine. 40 Haramiler Yayınları, 2006. 
 Özdemir, Cüneyt. The Cage Of Hell. Doğan Kitap, 2007. 
 Özdemir, Cüneyt. Agency Of High Affairs. Doğan Kitap, 2000. 
 Özdemir, Cüneyt. Country That Has Lost Its Joy. Doğan Kitap, 2014. 
 Özdemir, Cüneyt. "A Nation Is Standing: 15 July Testimonies". Doğan Kitap, 2016. 
 Özdemir, Cüneyt. "Sunflower: Words Dried By Summer Sun". Doğan Kitap, 2018.

References

External links

Cüneyt Özdemir on YouTube

Turkish journalists
1970 births
Living people
Meskhetian Turkish people
Radikal (newspaper) people
People from Ankara
Ankara University alumni
Turkish television journalists
Turkish columnists
Turkish writers
Golden Butterfly Award winners